Axelle Carolyn (born 3 April 1979 in Brussels) is a Belgian filmmaker and former actress and journalist.

Biography

Acting
Amongst many other jobs she worked on her way to directing her first films, Carolyn briefly worked in front of the camera. Her most notable appearance was as Pict warrior Aeron in Neil Marshall's Centurion.

Author career
A horror reporter for various magazines and websites from 2005 to 2008, Carolyn's non-fiction career culminated with the 2008 publication of It Lives Again! Horror Movies in the New Millennium, for which she won the Silver Award at the Book of the Year Awards; and 2018's FrightFest Guide to Ghost Movies, an analysis of the 200 most significant ghost stories ever made.
She also had several short stories published in various anthologies, including in Dark Delicacies III, and The Mammoth Book of Body Horror.

Directing career
After writing and directing a handful of award-winning short films,  Axelle released her first feature, ghost story Soulmate, in 2014. The opening scene, which depicted a graphic suicide scene, was censored in the UK by the BBFC. The movie premiered in Sitges in 2013, and went on to screen at genre festivals around the world before its release. It was generally well received, though its mix of horror, drama and gothic romance divided opinions. In 2014, she created the anthology movie Tales of Halloween, which she co-produced with Epic Pictures. She also wrote and directed her own segment "Grim Grinning Ghost". In 2018 she worked in the writers room of Netflix’s Chilling Adventures of Sabrina and co-wrote episode 9. In 2019, Axelle Carolyn directed episode 8 of Mike Flanagan's Netflix project The Haunting of Bly Manor entitled "The Romance of Certain Old Clothes." She also directed an episode of Creepshow for AMC. In 2021, she directed episodes of Flanagan’s The Midnight Club, as well as two episodes of season 10 of American Horror Story. 2021 also sees the release of her second full feature as writer-director: The Manor, a horror mystery produced by Amazon Studios, Blumhouse and Sandy King, and starring Barbara Hershey.

Personal life
Axelle lives in Los Angeles with her dog (and frequent star) Anubis. She was married to British filmmaker Neil Marshall from 2007 to 2016.

Filmography

References

External links
Blog

1979 births
Belgian film actresses
Living people
Belgian journalists
Actresses from Brussels
Belgian screenwriters
Belgian expatriates in England
Belgian make-up artists
21st-century Belgian actresses
Belgian women journalists
Belgian women screenwriters